"Salute Your Solution" is a song by the Raconteurs. It is the first single from their second album Consolers of the Lonely. It was released on March 25, 2008 the same day as the album release. Jack White and Brendan Benson share lead vocal duties on the track. The song is featured in the commercials for NFL on Fox, the 2009 comedy film Zombieland, 2012 action film Premium Rush , 2017 Power Rangers film , and is available as downloadable content for the music video games Guitar Hero World Tour and Rock Band 2, and it is featured in the launch trailer for Call of Duty: Advanced Warfare. The song was also in the documentary Warren Miller's Children of Winter.

The single peaked at number four on the Billboard Hot Modern Rock Tracks chart, their second highest-charting single (after 2006's "Steady, As She Goes").

Music video

A music video was made for the single and was released on March 25, 2008.  It was directed by Autumn de Wilde.

Critical response
Commenting on the rhythm section by Patrick Keeler (drums) and Jack Lawrence (bass), Prefix Magazine said that "their propulsive rhythm single-handedly saves first single 'Salute Your Solution'."
The Metro Times said the single "feature[s] monster guitar riffs that wouldn't sound out of place on a Free or early Aerosmith record." This song was number 42 on Rolling Stones list of the 100 Best Songs of 2008.

Track listing

7" and 12"

Chart positions

References

External links
"Salute Your Solution - review", Daily Music Guide

2008 songs
2008 singles
The Raconteurs songs
Third Man Records singles
Warner Records singles
Songs written by Jack White
Songs written by Brendan Benson
Black-and-white music videos